The Esso Longford gas explosion was a catastrophic industrial accident which occurred at the Esso natural gas plant at Longford in the Australian state of Victoria's Gippsland region. On 25 September 1998, an explosion took place at the plant, killing two workers and injuring eight. Gas supplies to the state of Victoria were severely affected for two weeks.

Context
In 1998, the Longford gas plant was owned by a joint partnership between Esso and BHP. Esso was responsible for the operation of the plant. Esso was a wholly owned subsidiary of US based company Exxon, which has since merged with Mobil, becoming ExxonMobil.

Built in 1969, the plant at Longford is the onshore receiving point for oil and natural gas output from production platforms in Bass Strait. The Longford Gas Plant Complex consists of three gas processing plants and one crude oil stabilisation plant. It was the primary provider of natural gas to Victoria, and provided some supply to New South Wales.

Normal processing procedure
The feed from the Bass Strait platforms consists of liquid and gaseous hydrocarbons, water and hydrogen sulfide (H2S). The water and H2S are removed before reaching the plant, leaving a hydrocarbon stream to be the feed to Gas Plant 1. This stream contained both gaseous and liquid components. The liquid component was known as "condensate". The liquefied petroleum gas (LPG) is further extracted by means of a shell and tube heat exchanger, in which heated "lean oil" and cold "rich oil" (oil which has absorbed LPG) are pumped into the exchanger, cooling the lean oil and heating the rich oil.

Explosion at Longford
During the morning of Friday 25 September 1998, a pump supplying heated lean oil to heat exchanger GP905 in Gas Plant No. 1 went offline for four hours, due to an increase in flow from the Marlin Gas Field which caused an overflow of condensate in the absorber. (The plant was complex and the hot oil pump was only one component involved in the accident process; why the pump shut down is complicated and important.)

A heat exchanger is a vessel that allows the transfer of heat from a hot stream to a cold stream, and so does not operate at a single temperature, but experiences a range of temperatures throughout the vessel. Ice had formed on the unit, and it was decided to resume pumping heated lean oil in to thaw it. When the lean oil pump resumed operation, it pumped oil into the heat exchanger at —the temperature differential caused a brittle fracture in the exchanger (GP905) at 12.26pm.

About 10 metric tonnes of hydrocarbon vapour were immediately vented from the rupture. A vapour cloud formed and drifted downwind. This caused a deflagration (a burning vapour cloud). The flame front burnt its way through the vapour cloud, without causing an explosion. When the flame front reached the rupture in the heat exchanger, a fierce jet fire developed that lasted for two days.

The rupture of GP905 led to other releases and minor fires. The main fire was an intense jet fire emanating from GP905. There was no blast wave—the nearby control room was undamaged. Damage was localised to the immediate area around and above the GP905 exchanger.

Peter Wilson and John Lowery were killed in the accident and eight others were injured.

Aftermath
The fire at the plant was not extinguished until two days later. The Longford plant was shut down immediately, and the state of Victoria was left without its primary gas supplier. Within days, VENCorp shut down the state's entire gas supply. The resulting gas supply shortage was devastating to Victoria's economy, crippling industry and the commercial sector (in particular, the hospitality industry which relied on natural gas for cooking). Loss to industry during the crisis was estimated at around A$1.3 billion.

As natural gas was also widely used in houses in Victoria for cooking, water heating and home heating, many Victorians endured 20 days without gas, hot water or heating.

Gas supplies to Victoria resumed on 14 October. Many Victorians were outraged and upset to discover only minor compensation on their next gas bill, with the average compensation figure being only around $10.

Royal Commission
A Royal Commission was called into the explosion at Longford, headed by former High Court judge Daryl Dawson. The Commission sat for 53 days, commencing with a preliminary hearing on 12 November 1998 and concluding with a closing address by Counsel Assisting the Royal Commission on 15 April 1999.

Esso blamed the accident on worker negligence, in particular Jim Ward, one of the panel workers on duty on the day of the explosion.

The findings of the Royal Commission, however, cleared Ward of any negligence or wrongdoing. Instead, the Commission found Esso fully responsible for the accident:

The causes of the accident on 25 September 1998 amounted to a failure to provide and maintain so far as practicable a working environment that was safe and without risks to health. This constituted a breach or breaches of Section 21 of the Occupational Health and Safety Act 1985.

Other findings of the Royal Commission included:
the Longford plant was poorly designed, and made isolation of dangerous vapours and materials very difficult;
inadequate training of personnel in normal operating procedures of a hazardous process;
excessive alarm and warning systems had caused workers to become desensitised to possible hazardous occurrences;
the relocation of plant engineers to Melbourne had reduced the quality of supervision at the plant;
poor communication between shifts meant that the pump shutdown was not communicated to the following shift.

Certain managerial shortcomings were also identified:
the company had neglected to commission a hazard and operability analysis of the heat exchange system, which would almost certainly have highlighted the risk of tank rupture caused by sudden temperature change;
Esso's two-tiered reporting system (from operators to supervisors to management) meant that certain warning signs such as a previous similar incident (on 28 August) were not reported to the appropriate parties;
the company's safety culture was more oriented towards preventing lost time due to accidents or injuries, rather than protection of workers and their health.

Legal ramifications
Esso was taken to the Supreme Court of Victoria by the Victorian WorkCover Authority. The jury found the company guilty of eleven breaches of the Occupational Health and Safety Act 1985, and Justice Philip Cummins imposed a record fine of $2 million in July 2001.

In addition, a class action was taken on behalf of businesses, industries and domestic users who were financially affected by the gas crisis. The class action went to trial in the Supreme Court on 4 September 2002, and was eventually settled in December 2004 when Esso was ordered to pay $32.5 million to businesses which suffered property damage as a result of the incident.

Following the Longford accident, Victoria introduced Major Hazard Facilities regulations to regulate safety at plants that contain major chemical hazards. These regulations impose a so-called "non-prescriptive" regime on facility operators, requiring them to demonstrate control of major chemical hazards via the use of a safety management system and a safety case.

Other states have also implemented similar regulatory regimes.

See also
 List of explosions

References

Notes
Hopkins, Andrew. Lessons From Longford: The Esso Gas Plant Explosion, CCH Australia Limited, 2000.

External links

Explosions in 1998
1998 disasters in Australia
1990s in Victoria (Australia)
1998 industrial disasters
Gas explosions
Explosions in Australia
Industrial fires and explosions in Australia
ExxonMobil history
Disasters in Victoria (Australia)
Victoria (Australia) royal commissions
September 1998 events in Australia
Gippsland (region)
Energy crises in Australia
1998 in Australia
Energy in Victoria (Australia)